Hellenic College of London was a bilingual school in Knightsbridge, London. It was founded in 1980 by former King Constantine II and Queen Anne-Marie of Greece, and closed in 2005.

It started as a boarding school, but it later also functioned as a day school. The second headmaster was James Wardrobe. The school was for Greek pupils or pupils with Greek origins. By 1996, it had 280 pupils, but after that it declined, finally having only 80 in 2005. Hellenic College's governors included Constantine, Anne-Marie, their son Nikolaos (an ex-pupil), and Michael Chandris.

References

External links
 School homepage (Archive)

International schools in London
Educational institutions established in 1980
Educational institutions disestablished in 2005
Defunct schools in the City of Westminster
1980 establishments in England
2005 disestablishments in England
Constantine II of Greece